The qualification for football tournament at the 1968 Summer Olympics.

Qualifications
The final tournament had 16 spots.

The others were allocated as follows:

 Europe: 4 places, contested by 18 teams.
 South America: 2 places, contested by 8 teams.
 North and Central America: 2 places, contested by 12 teams.
 Africa: 3 places, contested by 15 teams. 
 Asia: 3 places, contested by 11 teams.

Europe

South America

North and Central America

Africa

Asia

Group 1 
All matches played in Japan.

Japan qualify.

Group 2 
All matches played in Thailand: ,  and  withdrew.

Thailand qualify.

Group 3 

Israel qualify.

References

External links
 RSSSF

1968
1968 in association football